Minnesota State Highway 4 (MN 4) is a  highway in southwest and west-central Minnesota, which runs from Iowa Highway 4 at the Iowa state line (near Dunnell, MN and Estherville, IA), and continues north to its northern terminus at its interchange with Interstate Highway 94 near Sauk Centre and Melrose.

Route description
State Highway 4 serves as a north–south route between Sherburn, Saint James, Sleepy Eye, Fairfax,  Hector, Paynesville, and Meire Grove in southwest and west-central Minnesota.

Highway 4 parallels U.S. Highway 71 and State Highway 15 throughout its route.

Fort Ridgely State Park is located on Highway 4 in Nicollet County on the Minnesota River.  The park is located south of Fairfax and northwest of New Ulm.

History
The segment of Highway 4 between Paynesville and Interstate 94 is part of Minnesota Constitutional Route 4, established in 1920; the remainder of Highway 4 was authorized in 1933. Between Saint James and the Iowa border, Highway 4 followed very closely the former Minneapolis & St Louis Railway the remains of which are clearly visible on the west side of the highway between Minnesota Highway 60 and Sherburn, Minnesota. Grain elevators in Echols, Ormsby, Trimont, and Sherburn are aligned with the former M&StL route through each of these towns.

The route was completely paved by 1961.

Major intersections

References

004
Transportation in Stearns County, Minnesota
Transportation in Kandiyohi County, Minnesota
Transportation in Meeker County, Minnesota
Transportation in Renville County, Minnesota
Transportation in Brown County, Minnesota
Transportation in Watonwan County, Minnesota
Transportation in Martin County, Minnesota
Transportation in Nicollet County, Minnesota